Shalman Valley also spelled as Shilman or Shelman, is situated in Khyber Agency near Peshawar city, Khyber Pakhtunkhwa province of Pakistan. Shalman Valley is further divided into two parts, Kam Shalman and Loe Shalman. Kabul River enters from Afghanistan and passes through Shalman valley.

Shalmani also spelled as Shilmani, Shelmani, Sulemani is the tribe living in this valley.

Khyber District